The Malay Chronicles: Bloodlines (aka Clash of Empires: The Battle for Asia in the United Kingdom) is a 2011 Malaysian epic action film loosely based on the late 18th or 19th century document Hikayat Merong Mahawangsa (Kedah Annals), which is also its title as released in Malaysia (Hikayat Merong Mahawangsa). The film is directed, co-written, and co-produced by Yusry Abdul Halim. Narrating the early history of the state of Kedah, it stars Stephen Rahman-Hughes as Merong Mahawangsa, who escorts Prince Marcus Carprenius of the Roman Empire to Langkasuka to marry Princess Meng Li Hua from the Han Dynasty of China, thus uniting the two powers of East and West. The film was produced and distributed by KRU Studios.

The film was released to Malaysian cinemas nationwide beginning on 10 March 2011. The film won eight out of its 13 nominations in the 24th Malaysia Film Festival in the same year, including the category for Best Film.

Plot
The story begins with a mysterious man writing about the history of an old Malay kingdom so that people would not forget the history of the early Malay heroes. In 120 AD, the powerful Roman Empire, under the reign of Hadrian, had expanded its rule to the Central Asian countries. During their time of expanding, the great Roman Empire agreed to create an alliance with the Han Dynasty by marrying their two prince and princess, thus uniting the two powers both the East and West. However, the Roman prince, Marcus Carprenius (Gavin Stenhouse), did not agree with the decision. Instead, he wants to be free and not be controlled by politics. The Han princess, Meng Li Hua (Jing Lusi), also wants to be free instead being a pawn in a political game.

The Roman fleet sails off from the coast of Arabia to the mysterious peninsula dividing the two great kingdoms. The Roman fleet is struck by a powerful storm, which causes the Romans to lose much of their fleet. They go instead  to the coast of Goa. They are greeted by a local Goan dealer, (Mano Maniam), and later introduced to Merong Mahawangsa (Stephen Rahman-Hughes), said to be the descendant of Alexander the Great himself. Merong is preparing to duel against Sunder (Ravi Sunderlingam), a Goan nobleman who challenged him after finding out about Merong's illicit relationship with the nobleman's sister, Yasodharā (Deborah Henry). Merong defeats Sunder and Marcus is impressed by Merong's fighting skill. Subsequently, Merong agrees to escort Marcus to the peninsula while Lycius (Eric Karl Henrik Norman), the Roman fleet admiral returns to Rome and promises to return to Goa with a brand new fleet, carrying the payment in gold for the passage of the prince to the "Golden Chersonese". Merong is also promised a ship large enough for him to explore the known world.

Merong escorts Marcus to the peninsula and is greeted by the Chinese Admiral Liu Yun (Craig Robert Fong). Merong tells Marcus and Liu Yun that this peninsula was where he grew up and it is owned by several tribes. The night before the marriage, Meng Li Hua and her handmaiden, Ying Ying (Nell Ng) agrees to run away and begin a new life in the peninsula. However, Marcus follows Meng, resulting in their first meeting. The royal couple then grows closer to each other as they discover how they both have a common wish of being free from palace life. In the morning, The Chinese and the Romans are attacked by the pirate nation, Garuda. The Garuda leader, Taji (Wan Hanafi Su) uses black magic and sorcery before attacking to weaken their enemies. Meng and Ying Ying is kidnapped by Kamawas (Khir Rahman). Marcus tries to stop Kamawas but is stabbed and falls into the sea. Heavily outnumbered, the Chinese and the Romans are defeated. Merong, enraged by Marcus' apparent death, kills most of the Garuda fighters but is heavily injured and passes out.

Merong wakes up as he is getting treated by a tribe leader named Kesum (Rahim Razali). Kesum and Embok (Ummi Nazeera), one of the village's nurses treat Merong until he is well enough to fight again. Merong learns that Kesum and Taji were students to a once great magician and a brave warrior. Taji, wanting the great magician's amulet of immortality, kills the great magician during his sleep and led a small band of fighters to terrorise the villages. It was revealed that Merong's mother Lang (Umie Aida) was implied to be killed in the onslaught, which has since haunted Merong's dreams; while Embok was once raped by Kamawas during one of these raids. Consequently, Merong swore revenge to Kamawas. Kesum tells Merong of a prophecy that a great warrior will come and unite all the tribe into one kingdom and defeat the enemy. Kesum believes that Merong is the one. After hearing the prophecy, Merong becomes Kesum's student and begins uniting the tribes.

In the island of Garuda, Meng and Ying Ying are held captives for ransoms by Taji and Kamawas. Meng and Ying Ying manages to steal Kamawas a piece of the amulet of immortality. After Merong manages to unite all the tribes, they became one kingdom known as Langkasuka and began a new civilisation. Merong is then suddenly met by Liu Yen, Marcus (who was saved by Liu Yun and gets treated) and a small group of Chinese soldiers. Liu Yun tells Merong that they have to save the princess before she is killed. Merong is then given a ship full of mirrors by Liu Yun. As Merong prepares his fighters to invade the island of Garuda, Embok confessed her love to Merong.

Merong launches an attack toward Garuda in the morning. The Garuda prepared their ships and outnumbered Merong's fighters at least five to one. Merong revealed that he used the ship full of mirrors to create a similar weapon to the Archimedes Heat Ray and uses it to set all the Geruda ships and boats on fire (along with some of the men). Taji then uses sorcery to make storms and cover the sun with black clouds, rendering the weapon useless. After a heroic speech, Merong and his fighters launch an attack and land on the beaches. After a brief fight, Merong's fighters manage to take control the beach but another wave of Garuda fighters led by Taji came in to destroy the fighters. Merong's fighters fight to their death while Marcus confronts Kamawas, but Kamawas defeats Marcus easily. Before Kamawas could finish Marcus off, Liu Yen came in to stop Kamawas but is killed in the process. Most of Merong's fighters were killed. However, shortly after, A large fleet of the Romans and the Chinese, led by Admiral Lycius arrives on the scene and attacks Garuda, changing the tide of the battle. Merong arrives to save Marcus and confronts Kamawas. After a brief duel, Kamawas is finally defeated. Merong tries to kill Taji but is stabbed. Merong makes a sacrifice by taking the amulet off and pushing the sword forward, thus killing them both. Right after Merong dies, the Romans and the Chinese attack and finish off the last of the Garuda, ending the battle.

Many years after the great battle, it is revealed that the mysterious narrator is Sultan Mudzafar Shah, the first Sultan of Kedah writing about the history of Merong Mahawangsa in the Kedah Annals. The Sultan tells that Langkasuka was known as a great and proud Kingdom. The film ends with a flashback to Merong being pronounced a hero and the first king of Langkasuka.

Cast
 Stephen Rahman-Hughes as Merong Mahawangsa.

The Roman delegation 
 Gavin Stenhouse as Marcus Carprenius, Prince of the Roman Empire.
 Eric Karl Henrik Norman as Lycius, Admiral of Rome.

The Chinese delegation 
 Jing Lusi as Meng Li Hua, Princess of the Han Dynasty.
 Craig Fong as Liu Yun, Admiral of China.
 Nell Ng as Ying Ying, Meng Li Hua's close and personal friend
 Keith Chong as the Emperor of China.

Pirates of Garuda 
The Garuda in the original tale is depicted as a gigantic bird-like creature whereas the film—due to limitations of the technology needed to recreate the bird—instead portrays it as a different entity, particularly a pirate tribe nation with its own island.
 Wan Hanafi Su as Taji, The leader of the pirate nation of Geruda. (The name Taji, meaning 'spur' or 'talon' in Malay, alludes to the Garuda.)
 Khir Rahman as Kamawas, Taji's student who kidnaps Princess Meng Li Hua. (His name is derived from the word mawas or 'ape', an allusion to Hanuman.)

The village people 
 Rahim Razali as Kesum, a Malay medicine man who knew Merong since he was young.
 Ummi Nazeera as Embok, a nurse and also Merong's lover.

Other characters 
 Hafizuddin Fadzil as Sultan Mudzafar Shah or Phra Ong Mahawangsa, the narrator of the story.
 Mano Maniam as the local Goan dealer.
 Ravi Sunderlingam as Sunder, the Goan warrior.
 Deborah Priya Henry as Yasodharā, the wife of Siddhārtha Gautama.
 Jehan Miskin as Embi, the Malay warrior.
 Umie Aida as Lang, Merong Mahawangsa's mother as seen from a flashback
 Maya Karin as Goan Villager

Production

Music
The film's music score was initially composed by Reza Ramsey and Yudi Ashady before they undergo re-arrangements to be played by the Malaysian Philharmonic Orchestra under the direction of Claus Peter Flor.

Anuar Zain sings the theme song for the film, titled "Sedetik Lebih", which was composed by Edry Abdul Halim.

Release
The first official trailer was released in October 2010. The production was completed several months later. KRU Studios later announced that the film would be screened in the cinemas on 11 March 2011.

This film was shown for the first time during a royal audience with the Sultan of Kedah, Abdul Halim Muadzam Shah and his family on 25 February 2011 prior to a nationwide release in March of the same year. A 30-minute making-of programme was broadcast on Malaysian TV station TV3 as part of the promotion, showing various elements of the production behind the scenes and also exclusive interviews with the cast and the crew.

The film was later made available in the on-demand service Astro First on 21 April 2011. The DVD was also released on the same day. It was eventually released on the Blu-ray format in the United Kingdom on 23 May, becoming the first Malaysian made feature film to do so.

After its release in Malaysia, Singapore and Brunei; the United Kingdom was the next country to screen the film. The film was released there under the title Clash of Empires: Battle for Asia.

Home media
Hikayat Merong Mahawangsa was released in the DVD format on 21 April 2011 in Malaysia. In the United Kingdom, the film has been released on Blu-ray and DVD under the title Clash of Empires: Battle for Asia on 23 May 2011. Its British release makes it the second Malaysian film to be released on Blu-ray after Ice Kacang Puppy Love which was released in Hong Kong.

Reception

Box office
Following its Malaysian release, the film grossed MYR 6.3 million at the box-office  (only in Malaysia) by the end of March 2011, making the film the most successful local epic film.

References

External links
 The Malay Chronicles: Bloodlines at the Internet Movie Database

2011 films
Malay-language films
2010s action adventure films
KRU Studios films
English-language Malaysian films
Chinese-language Malaysian films
Films set in the 16th century
Historical epic films
2010s historical films
Malaysian action films
Malaysian historical films
History of Malaysia on film